Juan Ramón Zapata (born 18 June 1974 in Moncada) is a Spanish racing driver. He has competed in such series as Euroseries 3000 and the Spanish Formula Three Championship.

References

External links
 

Spanish racing drivers
1974 births
Living people
Euroformula Open Championship drivers
Auto GP drivers